JWH-007 is an analgesic chemical from the naphthoylindole family, which acts as a cannabinoid agonist at both the CB1 and CB2 receptors. It was first reported in 1994 by a group including the noted cannabinoid chemist John W. Huffman. It was the most active of the first group of N-alkyl naphoylindoles discovered by the team led by John W Huffman, several years after the family was initially described with the discovery of the N-morpholinylethyl compounds pravadoline (WIN 48,098), JWH-200 (WIN 55,225) and WIN 55,212-2 by the Sterling Winthrop group. Several other N-alkyl substituents were found to be active by Huffman's team including the n-butyl, n-hexyl, 2-heptyl, and cyclohexylethyl groups, but it was subsequently determined that the 2-methyl group on the indole ring is not required for CB1 binding, and tends to increase affinity for CB2 instead.  Consequently, the 2-desmethyl derivative of JWH-007, JWH-018, has slightly higher binding affinity for CB1, with an optimum binding of 9.00 nM at CB1 and 2.94 nM at CB2, and JWH-007 displayed optimum binding of 9.50 nM at CB1 and 2.94 nM at CB2.

Another drug similarly named JHW-007 (not JWH) is a cocaine analog (the di-para-fluoro benztropine, being essentially a hybrid between benzatropine and difluoropine; with fluorine groups in the former or being descarbmethoxy in the latter) and atypical dopamine reuptake inhibitor, but is distinct from and not the same as this JWH-007.

Legal status 
In the United States, all CB1 receptor agonists of the 3-(1-naphthoyl)indole class such as JWH-007 are Schedule I Controlled Substances.

JWH-007 was banned in Sweden on 1 October 2010 after being identified as an ingredient in "herbal" synthetic cannabis products.

JWH-007 has been illegal in Poland since August 2010

As of October 2015 JWH-007 is a controlled substance in China.

See also 
JWH-015
JWH-018
JWH-019
JWH-073
List of JWH cannabinoids

References 

Designer drugs
JWH cannabinoids
Naphthoylindoles
CB1 receptor agonists
CB2 receptor agonists